Pixie (Megan Gwynn) is a superheroine appearing in American comic books published by Marvel Comics. Created by Nunzio DeFilippis, Christina Weir, and Michael Ryan, the character first appeared in New X-Men: Academy X #5 (November 2004). She belongs to the subspecies of humans called mutants, who are born with superhuman abilities, and to the species of humanoid magical beings named fairies, who are born with supernatural powers. Her hybrid mutation grants her pixie-like eyes, colorful wings that allow her to fly, and "pixie dust" which causes hallucinations. After a confrontation with the revived former member of the New Mutants, Magik, she gains the ability to use magic and a magical weapon called the "Souldagger."

Her main use of magic is a massive teleportation spell, which makes her a key asset to various X-Men missions and teams and places her as one of the titles' primary magic users. She was first introduced as a student on the Paragons training squad at the Xavier Institute in New X-Men: Academy X #5 (November 2004), later joining the New X-Men team, and then graduating to the Uncanny X-Men team.

Pixie has been described as one of Marvel's most notable and powerful female heroes.

Publication history
Pixie made her debut in New X-Men: Academy X #5 (November 2004) and was created by Nunzio DeFilippis, Christina Weir, and Michael Ryan. Though only a side character in her initial appearances, she has since become a prominent character in various X-Men titles.

Fictional character biography
Megan Gwynn is a Welsh teenager from a fictional mining town called Abergylid. Her father died in the mine and because of that she developed a fear of it and left Wales. She would later discover that he wasn't really her father, but the villainous Mastermind. Lady Mastermind and Mastermind II are her half-sisters. In her original inception, she had short pink hair, pure black eyes and butterfly-like rainbow wings.

After enrolling at Xavier Institute, Pixie is assigned to be part of the Paragons training squad under the tutelage of former New Mutant member Rahne Sinclair. She wears a bicycle helmet during training sessions, due to her uncertainty with flying. During this time, she develops a crush on the X-Man Cyclops and is considered a cheerful girl who fits in well with other students; she was voted Friendliest Student.

M-Day
Following the events of House of M, almost all of the Institute's students are depowered, which leads to the dissolution of the school's training squad system. Pixie is one of only twenty-seven students, including her fellow Paragons Trance, Wolf Cub, and Match, not to have lost her mutant abilities.

She participates in Emma Frost's battle royal which determines who will train to be an X-Man, but does not make the team. She remains at the school, appearing occasionally as a side character. Later, forty-two of Pixie's former classmates are killed when their bus is blown up by a missile sent by William Stryker, an anti-mutant crusader. Among the confirmed deaths are Gwynn's fellow Paragon, DJ.

Quest For Magik
Pixie, along with Anole, Loa, Wolf Cub, Rockslide, and Match, are told a frightening ghost story by fellow student Blindfold one night at the school. However, they discover that the story is not fictitious, but rather a prophecy; telling Pixie that she is "sorry for [her] loss," Blindfold and her classmates are sucked into the realm of Limbo, where they are immediately attacked by a mob of demons.

Pixie stays by Blindfold's side during the fight, and Blindfold cautions Pixie and the others that Pixie must not "fall to darkness." Pixie uses her powers on-panel for the first time during the fight, incapacitating several demons with her "pixie dust." After Darkchilde saves the small group, she asks N'astirh to bring Pixie to her, recognizing that Pixie's soul is the most innocent and therefore the most powerful in Limbo. Despite her friends' pleas, Megan submits to Magik's request to use her soul to create a Soulsword and Bloodstones, magical stones forged from an innocent soul that grant great power to their owners, but is freed from the process by Anole. His intervention saves her, but leaves the spell unfinished, resulting in the creation of only one Bloodstone and a "Souldagger" instead. Magik then explains that the Souldagger is actually a portion of Pixie's own soul and that black magic has now filled the hole left behind in the knife's creation, leaving Pixie no longer an innocent; this is represented graphically by a great portion of her pink hair changing to black.

Magik teaches Pixie a teleportation spell and she uses it to teleport herself and her friends to Belasco to prevent him from torturing the rest of the students. Pixie saves the students and ultimately kills Belasco by stabbing him with the Souldagger. After defeating Belasco, Magik wants to use more of Pixie's soul to create more Bloodstones to gain more power, but becomes disgusted with herself when her brother calls out to her; she instead sends Pixie and the others back to the Xavier Institute and seals all entrances to Limbo. Pixie and Anole are then made official members of the New X-Men for their bravery in Limbo at the insistence of Rockslide. Pixie later reveals that Doctor Strange will tutor her in magic when she comes of age and begins receiving additional training.

Messiah Complex
When the first new mutant since M-Day appears, Pixie joins X-23, Hellion, Anole, Surge, Armor, and Rockslide in attacking the Washington, D.C. base of the ant-mutant Purifiers by teleporting them there. They are confronted by Lady Deathstrike and the Reavers with Hellion receiving a near mortal injury. They are greatly outnumbered; Pixie panics and cannot teleport the team out until Rictor, who infiltrated the Purifiers as a spy, helps her concentrate. Pixie manages to cast a hazardous "blind teleport", which scatters the New X-Men between Washington, D.C. and the Xavier Institute The students are then recovered and taken back to the Institute by Iceman, and the wounded sent to the infirmary. However, Predator X later attacks the Institute, going after the weaker, wounded students in the infirmary. Pixie, realizing that X-23 had killed this type of creature before, attempts to teleport Predator X to X-23's location, but mistakenly takes the majority of the students and Beast along with her and the creature, dropping them in the middle of the X-Men's fight for the mutant baby with the Marauders on Muir Island. During the fight, Pixie is brutally beaten by the Malice-possessed Omega Sentinel, who taunts Pixie until Megan manages to defeat her by unexpectedly stabbing her with the Souldagger, exorcising Malice from Omega Sentinel's body.

Pixies and Demons
In the 2008 Free Comic Book Day X-Men one-shot story titled "Pixies and Demons," Pixie returns to her hometown after the X-Men disband following the conclusion of Messiah Complex. However, she finds the demonic N'Garai are plaguing the town and are kidnapping people to feed Kierrok the Damned, their leader. Pixie calls in the X-Men to help defeat the N'Garai and Megan has to face her fear of the mine in which her father was killed in order to defeat the demons. After defeating Kierrok, Cyclops and the rest of the X-Men take her back to America and she joins the newly reformed X-Men in San Francisco.

Manifest Destiny
After leaving one of Dazzler's gigs, Pixie is ambushed by a group of masked anti-mutant men calling themselves the Hellfire Cult. She is overpowered by the attackers and is subjected to beatings that leave her incapacitated. She manages to make her way back to the X-Men's new base and is immediately taken care of by Wolverine, Nightcrawler, Karma, and Beast. The attack and the events of the previous year cause her to question whether or not she wants to continue as part of the X-Men, but a discussion with Wolverine causes her to stay and assist them against Empath, whose powers have grown out of control. After beating him up, she stabs him in the head with her Souldagger, leaving him blind and his powers weakened. She decides to remain with the X-Men, assisting them in various other missions, including the Skrull invasion of San Francisco. According to writer Matt Fraction, her role is that of Kitty Pryde and Jubilee when they first joined the X-Men. Her strong magical ability as a teleporter with nearly unlimited distance and capacity also causes Nightcrawler, who is much more limited and traditionally serves as the X-Men's primary teleporter, to question his future usefulness to the team, though he later comes to terms with his own abilities.

X-Infernus

Despite her cheerful persona, Pixie begins to reveal her anger and bitterness over her initial experience in Limbo and her incomplete soul, feeling that she is less than human. During a training session, Nightcrawler points out that her personality changes when she uses the Souldagger. This causes her to summon it and her personality turns sinister and she stabs him in the chest, causing him to pass out. Upon regaining her senses and removing the dagger, she finds that it has freed the Soulsword housed within Kurt's body. Sensing the Soulsword, Magik teleports to Earth to reclaim it. However, Pixie engages her in a fight, demanding to have the stolen portion of her soul returned and refuses to hand over the sword. Magik defeats her and regains her Soulsword, teleporting away and leaving Colossus distraught. The X-Men learn that they are now able to enter Limbo through Pixie's teleportation spell, and a team consisting of Colossus, Wolverine, Mercury, Rockslide, Pixie, and Nightcrawler is formed to reclaim Magik. Nightcrawler is put in charge due to Pixie's and Colossus' personal stakes in the mission.

While the X-Men battle various demons in Limbo, Belasco's daughter, Witchfire defeats Magik and adds Pixie's Bloodstone to her amulet, causing Pixie to lose control and teleport herself to Belasco's castle. There, Witchfire forces her to become her new apprentice and begins forging a final new Bloodstone from Pixie's soul, causing her to nightmarishly transform completely into a demon. Witchfire uses the Bloodstones to summon the Elder Gods to her aid. Pixie is reluctantly forced to work together with Magik to defeat Witchfire. While the X-Men battle the Elder Gods, Illyana fights Witchfire and strips her of the amulet containing the Bloodstones. Illyana and Pixie use their blades to destroy the amulet, but Witchfire escapes the crumbling castle into the Elder Gods' dimension, claiming to return for her "apprentice." Pixie is despondent over losing more of her soul and tries to attack Magik with her Souldagger, but the glowing stone in its blade indicates that the additional stolen piece of her soul is inside it. Pixie flies away in tears into the wilds of Limbo, upset over the additional loss of her soul.

Return from Limbo
Pixie returns to the X-Men, but demonstrating noticeably improved fighting ability and greater anger when she hears about "Proposition X," a piece of anti-mutant legislation seeking to control mutant reproduction. She continues to work with the X-Men, using her abilities to defeat enemies such as Empath and rescue several students and team members, such as when the Sisterhood, a team of mutant villainesses led by a revived Madelyne Pryor, attack the X-Men's headquarters. During the protests between anti-mutant and pro-mutant movements about mutant reproductive rights, Pixie is injured when a riot breaks out. Later she teleports Rogue, Gambit and Danger to San Francisco for assistance. She is later made a part of a team to battle Emma Frost's Dark X-Men. After Emma Frost, Namor and Cloak and Dagger betray the Dark X-Men and Norman Osborn and relocate to Utopia, Pixie and Magik begin teleporting everyone to their new island base. During the final battle, Pixie joins Armor and X-23 in fighting Daken.

Pixie Strikes Back
In the 2010 miniseries Pixie Strikes Back, Pixie finds herself and several of her teenage teammates under a spell, causing them to live under the impression that they are ordinary high school girls. However, the illusion begins to fade, with Pixie finding herself in confrontation with the demon Saturnyne.  Meanwhile, a woman arrives on Utopia claiming to be her mother, demanding to see her. Later, her mother shows up in the Wyngarde mansion, where Lady Mastermind is fighting with Martinique. She tells them to stop acting like the babies of the family and that they have been usurped while Pixie is seen in the next panel, revealing that Jason Wyngarde is her father and the Mastermind sisters are her siblings.

X-Men: Second Coming
When Cable and Hope Summers return from the future, Bastion starts putting his plans into action in taking her out. He first begins by taking out the X-Men's teleporters with Magik the first to fall; sending her to Limbo with a weaponized spell. After Ariel is taken out, Pixie requests to take her place only to be refused by Cyclops. Pixie is then placed on a rescue team to get Magik back from Limbo where she encounters N'Astirh who tries to convince her to kill Magik and in exchange he will give her back the rest of her soul. After Pixie turns on him and frees Magik, they assist Anole and Cannonball against Gambit and the corrupted Dazzler and Northstar. After the battle is over the two girls come to understand each other better.

New Mutants
Following the events of Second Coming, like the New Mutants, Pixie goes for a holiday to relax. Magik comes to request her help in her own personal war but Pixie dismisses her, claiming that the last time she helped Magik, she ripped out a piece of her soul and she just rescued her from Limbo. She is then ambushed and captured by Project Purgatory who steal her Souldagger. After Project Purgatory capture the New Mutants, they use Magik's Soulsword to separate the bloodstone from Pixie's Souldagger. Escaping with Magik and Karma, Pixie is returned to Utopia where she recovers while the rest of the X-Men begin to battle the Elder Gods. Once the Elder Gods and Project Purgatory have been defeated, Magik comes to Pixie with a golden box containing her Souldagger and both her bloodstones.

Hell To Pay
Pixie, along with a few other X-Men are summoned to a town by Dani Moonstar where an attack decades earlier by some demons led to them becoming trapped in one of the town's residents to protect them all. Now that she is dying they need to figure out how to deal with the demons. Pixie demonstrates she has some knowledge in sealing spells and entrapment wards. After the arrival of the new Ghost Rider, the demons are released and a battle ensues. Working together with Ghost Rider, they send the demons back to Hell with Pixie reciting a spell, sealing them for good.

X-Men: Schism
During the events of Schism, Pixie has been teleporting various teams of X-Men around the world to combat all the sentinels. During one fight she injures her hands and has to sit out as she can no longer teleport. According to her, without painkillers, it hurts too much to concentrate and with them, she cannot think straight enough but will still stand by her fellow students to help take on the giant sentinel approaching Utopia.

Regenesis
Recovering from the events of Schism, Pixie approaches Velocidad at first to get help with her medication but when they start talking, things become quite flirty between them and eventually start kissing. Hope walks in and catches them in the act and storms out. Pixie then slaps Velocidad and leaves. Later Pixie is packing to return to Westchester when Hope approaches and begs her to join her team, as they need a teleporter.

After a training exercise, Hope finds a new light on Cerebra and has Pixie teleport the group to Pakistan to locate the mutant. The group splits up with Pixie teamed with Velocidad. They are ambushed by soldiers and separated. Pixie ends up captured by them and after being rescued, teleports the team and an amnesic Sebastian Shaw back to Utopia.

Wolverine and the X-Men
Pixie graduated from the Jean Grey School for Higher Learning and became an official X-Man in the final issue of Wolverine and the X-Men.

Powers and abilities
Megan possesses insect-like wings (depicted of various colors, depending on the artist) that allow her to fly. Initially, her wings were broad and multicolored, similar to a butterfly's, but recent depictions show her to have iridescent, translucent wings, more like those of a dragonfly. It has been suggested that her wings' appearance is affected by her psychological state.

In addition, her mutation allows her to produce a "pixie dust" that causes hallucinations, often with comedic effects, such as demons seeing bright bubbles and teddy bears, or in one instance, causing Wolverine to see and try to fight a herd of unicorns. In another instance, Megan uses her dust seemingly harmlessly to enhance the audience's perceptions of Dazzler's light show during a concert. She states that she has no idea what individuals affected by her dust are seeing.

After Magik takes part of Megan's soul in an attempt to create a Soulsword, her appearance changes, reflecting the portion of her soul lost to black magic. Artists' depictions of this change in her personality are inconsistent, but typically depict her pink hair with black streaks. She also has the ability to detect the supernatural, as evidenced when she fought the N'Garai who were under a cloaking spell. When asked how she knows where they are she replies, "there's a sliver of darkness that Magik put inside my soul... And it's like a compass needle for other dark... stuff." She has also been trained in hand-to-hand combat at the institute.

Because the spell to steal Megan's soul was interrupted, a new Soulsword could not be formed; instead, Megan can summon a Souldagger, a mystical item that disrupts magical constructs and harms magical beings. Because of her connection with Magik, as Megan uses the Souldagger, her personality changes and becomes darker and more disturbing. Her dagger later changes from silver to red after it absorbs Pixie's Bloodstone. It is unclear if this change is merely cosmetic. Like recent depictions of the Soulsword, Pixie's Souldagger appears to have physical effects beyond disrupting magic and harming magical creatures. For example, while the abilities of the mutant Malice are psionic and based on mutation and not magic, the soul dagger is able to exorcise Malice's psyche from Karima Shapandar. It also appears to have physically harmed Empath, disrupting his psychic abilities and leaving him blind after she stabs him in the head with it.

Though untrained in the mystic arts, Pixie is able to wield magic, largely due to black magic which has filled the missing portions of her soul. Pixie can recite the incantation taught to her by Illyana Rasputin ("Sihal Novarum Chinoth") to teleport over long distances and to the dimension of Limbo. She is capable of teleporting herself and large groups over vast distances and across dimensions with relative ease, though teleporting without focusing ("blind teleporting") can be hazardous, causing those transported to be scattered and potentially causing injury to Pixie herself. Megan has also been able to banish demons using magic. Megan has demonstrated that she is capable of casting a sleeping spell. Following the events of "Quest for Magik," Pixie is approached by both Doctor Strange and Amanda Sefton to receive formal tutelage in sorcery after she has come of age.

Reception

Critical reception 
Mike Fugere of CBR.com described Pixie as one of the "X-Men who are way more powerful than they look," writing, "Megan Gwynn, the adorably cheerful mutant with rainbow fairy wings known as Pixie, was created by husband and wife writing team Nunzio DeFilippis and Christina Weir along with artist Michael Ryan (Mystique, New Excalibur). Pixie made her first appearance in New X-Men: Academy X #5 back in 2004. Her exuberant attitude towards her fellow classmates at the Xavier Institute earned the title of Xavier's “Friendliest Student.” Considering Pixie’s effervescent attitude and pink haired, iridescent-winged exterior, there's really no better candidate for the superlative. Even Jubilee, at her most jovial, was never as warm and welcoming as Pixie. But don't let her adorable veneer lead you astray. Megan Gwynn packs quite a punch." Matthew Perpetua of BuzzFeed stated, "Pixie is basically like a mashup of Magik and Jubilee—she's got the former's teleportation and magical powers, but has the spunky, sarcastic qualities of the latter. For a while it seemed like she was brought into the cast to fill the obligatory "teenage girl" role, but she's developed into a more nuanced character over time despite having an increasingly smaller role in the franchise." John Tibbetts of WhatCulture asserted, "Pixie is one of those characters that you have to actually be dead inside to not absolutely love. She's bubbly, friendly, has boundless optimism, but is also the first one to kick your ass six ways from Sunday if you cause trouble. Her pixie wings give her the ability to fly, almost twice as fast as Angel when she sets her mind to it, she can release "pixie dust" that gives anyone it hits powerful hallucinations, and also she's a witch. Like a straight up candidate for sorcerer supreme should Doctor Strange ever bite it. Sure right now she can just barely conjure up a sleeping spell and the ability to teleport, but all of this alone makes her a natural fit for the X-Men should Marvel be smart enough to realize the money printer Pixie could prove to be in marketing if they pull her off right."

Robert Mclaughlin of Den of Geek stated, "While Cyclops, Storm, Wolverine, Gambit and some of the more popular characters have already made their screen debut, there’s still over one hundred-and-ninety-eight mutants for the filmmakers to play with, and if Riptide and Azazel can be made to look cool, then some more of these more obscure, yet visually exciting mutants can too. Megan Gwynn is a Welsh mutant with a visually fun physical mutation. Sporting pink hair, large fairy wings and pointy ears, her mutant power is the ability to teleport and to sprinkle hallucination-based pixie dust on her opponents. A current fan favourite, she’s a relatively recent addition to the X-Men team, having originally appeared in the continually re-titled X-Men Academy/New X-Men. The addition of a bright, visually appealing and fun character with a jovial light-hearted ‘bubble gum pop’ personality would replace the flying character of Angel from the first movie. And having an upbeat, positive member of the team would make a break from the angst of the rest of the team." Chris Condry of Looper said, "Pixie, whose real name is Megan Gwynn, is just as fun and fascinating as her older, bluer counterpart and has far more potential in the coming decades. Unlike Nightcrawler, Gwynn is far from a one-trick pony. In addition to teleportation, Gwynn's powers include flight, emitting hallucinogenic pixie dust, daggers made from her own soul, and most importantly, spell-casting. As a budding sorcerer, Gwynn's potential is almost limitless. During the "Dark Reign" event, she was even considered as a candidate to replace Doctor Strange as the next Sorcerer Supreme. Both mutant and magic, Pixie has a rare place in multiple Marvel arenas and could slot into the MCU in a few different ways. Though Pixie has mostly been relegated to the kids' table and considered a "Young X-Men" or "New Mutant," her power, personality, and promise are starting to make her too big for her highchair." George Marston of Newsarama wrote, "Marvel Studios is doubling down on its magical wing as one of the tentpoles of its current era, and there are few better mutants to connect a new X-Men team to that corner of the MCU than the ethereal, effervescent Pixie—whose fae codename is a perfect indicator of her powers, which include a pair of gossamer wings, teleportation, and a natural aptitude for magical skill. And not for nothing, if the MCU needs some youthful mutants for a younger-skewing X-Men team—or even some students in some capacity—Pixie makes for a spot-on addition as an ingenue for a team that always has at least one young, impressionable mutant in its ranks."

Accolades 

 In 2014, BuzzFeed ranked Pixie 41st in their "95 X-Men Members Ranked From Worst To Best" list.
 In 2014, Entertainment Weekly ranked Pixie 64th in their "Let's rank every X-Man ever" list.
 In 2016, ComicsAlliance gave Pixie a score of 38 out of 50 in their "100 X-Men: How Do Sunspot, Pixie, Leech, Revanche And Quicksilver Rate As Great X-Men?" list.
 In 2017, Den of Geek included Pixie in their "40 X-Men Characters Who Haven’t Appeared in the Movies But Should" list.
 In 2018, CBR.com ranked Pixie 20th in their "20 Most Powerful Supernatural Marvel Characters" list, 20th in their "20 X-Men Who Are Much More Powerful Than They Look" list, and 25th in their "25 Most Powerful Young X-Men" list.
 In 2018, Gay Star News ranked Pixie 3rd in their "7 LGBTI heroes we want to see in Marvel’s new all-female TV series" list.
 In 2019, Sideshow included Pixie in their "Marvel’s Most Masterful Witches" list.
 In 2019, Zavvi included Pixie in their "10 Characters From Marvel Comics We Want To See In The MCU" list.
 In 2020, Scary Mommy included Pixie in their "Looking For A Role Model? These 195+ Marvel Female Characters Are Truly Heroic" list.
 In 2020, WhatCulture ranked Pixie 2nd in their "Marvel Phase 4: 10 Mutants Who Should Be MCU X-Men" list.
 In 2022, Newsarama included Pixie in their "20 X-Men characters that should make the jump from Marvel comics to the MCU" list.
 In 2022, MovieWeb ranked Pixie 8th in their "8 LGBTQ+ Marvel Comics Characters That Need to Be in the MCU" list.
 In 2022, Screen Rant included Pixie in their "MCU: 10 Characters Who Should Be Students At Strange Academy" list.
 In 2022, CBR.com ranked Pixie's apparition in the Avengers vs. X-Men crossover 9th in their "10 Best Fights From Avengers Vs X-Men" list.

Literary reception

Volumes

X-Men: Pixie Strikes Back  - 2010

Issue 1 
According to Diamond Comic Distributors, X-Men: Pixie Strikes Back #1 was the 114th best selling comic book in February 2010.

James Hunt of CBR.com called X-Men: Pixie Strikes Back #1 an "interesting spin on the character," saying, "One of the reasons Pixie has been steadily growing in popularity is that the character's visual is rather more striking than many of her peers. The fairy wings, pink hair and dark eyes make her as iconic as any of the "classic" X-Men, and Sara Pichelli does the character justice with her artwork. Indeed, all the characters. In Immonen and Pichelli, Marvel have managed to find a fantastic creative team (and, letterer aside, an all-female at that) with a distinctive and original take on the X-Men. Compared to the rather dour and homogenous feeling most of the line has at the moment, this can't help but stand out. It might not have an event to piggyback on, but it is, undoubtedly, a worthwhile purchase for all current X-fans." Bryan Joel of IGN gave X-Men: Pixie Strikes Back #1 a grade of 7.2 out of 10, writing, "A cross between Runaways and New X-Men is a pretty accurate description of the feel this issue has, and even though it's Pixie getting top billing, her friends like Mercury and Rockslide get cameos. The first issue is a dizzy mix of high school antics and moderate superheroics, with some intentionally confusing and disorienting elements. There's a lot to like here, with some very expressive art by Pichelli and fun small character moments throughout. Pixie's mother is the highlight of the issue, making her grand debut in a manner that only a woman who birthed a tiny pink girl with wings could. Now, what's interesting to note is that Pixie Strikes Back is worlds away from the current thrust of the X-world. Utopia gets only cursory mentions in passing, virtually no adult X-Men appear in any meaningful way, and the tone is lighthearted and bouncy. Some harder-edged readers will probably be put off by Pichelli's bright, manga-informed artwork, and Immonen's twee plot. But if you dig beneath the surface there's the suggestion of more sinister plot elements at play, and more than one passing reference to Pixie's heritage being something other than what Matt Fraction established in the X-Men's Free Comic Book Day giveaway a few years back. Ostensibly, there's more to be done with this series than "Pixie and her friends eat multicolored cupcakes, yay!" All signs point to Pixie Strikes Back veering more into traditional territory down the line, but as far as this issue's concerned, it's a welcomed alternate take on the junior team with some unexpected wit from Immonen and more than a few charming qualities. Basically, if you were put off by the idea of a mini-series called Pixie Strikes Back, issue #1 is probably not going to change your tune. If you can get past that, however, it's a cool little X-curio."

Issue 2 
According to Diamond Comic Distributors, X-Men: Pixie Strikes Back #2 was the 154th best selling comic book in March 2010.

Greg McElhatton of CBR.com described X-Men: Pixie Strikes Back #2 as an "enticing read," asserting, "I wasn't entirely sure what to expect with a "X-Men: Pixie Strikes Back!" mini-series. Pixie has never been a character that seemed to scream, "I need a solo spotlight!" (although her storyline in "Uncanny X-Men" about a year and a half ago was fun), and my first thought was that Marvel had gone back to the old phase of, "shove anything out with an X-Men logo that you can," resulting in all sorts of odd choices for mini-series and ongoing series getting the green light. Fortunately, "X-Men: Pixie Strikes Back!" justifies its existence by having a strong authorial voice in the form of Kathryn Immonen. I'd forgotten how much I loved her "Patsy Walker: Hellcat" mini-series, in no small part due to the snappy dialogue and narration of the comic. That's present here, as well; sometimes it's in the background (like X-23 and Armor bickering about variation versus repetition), sometimes the foreground (a fun scene where it's a small wonder the White Queen hasn't pulled all her hair out by the time it's over). It's all slightly off-kilter but in a good way, giving the comic its own unique voice that straddles the line between over-the-top and realistic. What's also impressive about Immonen's writing is that, after having revealed in the first issue that Pixie and several of her fellow students are trapped in a dream world, that she's managed to keep both the real and the fake worlds exciting and interesting. More often than not, a story with some sort of fake world that characters are trapped in has the not-real turn dull as soon as its true nature is revealed. Instead I found myself still curious and intrigued by that narrative, and that's no small feat. I never did get a chance to read Immonen and Sara Pichelli's brief stint on "Runaways," so it was a new experience for me to see her art here. It's good, a blocky sort of style that reminds me of small elements of Chris Bachalo's and Rick Leonardi's art. Some characters look better than others under her pen; this is certainly the most unglamorous White Queen we've ever seen, but Pixie in particular looks great. In particular I found myself enthralled by how Pichelli draws hair, almost as if it hangs in strands and clumps. It's an interesting look, and I'm looking forward to seeing more Pichelli art down the line. X-Men: Pixie Strikes Back! may look like another disposable mutant mini-series, but Immonen's snappy script is strong enough that it's quietly beating the odds. If all mini-series and one-offs were this strong, I think we'd have a lot more happy customers in the store buying them." Dan Iverson of IGN ranked the cover of the comic book X-Men: Pixie Strikes Back #2 78th in their "Top 100 Comic Book Covers of 2010" list, writing, "Our picks for best cover of the year were chosen based on artistic quality, representation of the content within, entertainment value, and our editors' personal leanings."

Other versions

Age of X
In the "Age of X" reality, Megan is known as "Nightmare" and her "pixie dust" causes frightening hallucinations. Compared to her Earth-616 counterpart, her pixie dust only requires skin contact to take effect, instead of inhalation. Her appearance is different as well, with her skin tone lavender and her wings having a bat-like appearance. Her personality is also more sassy and unreserved compared to her Earth-616 counterpart.

Ultimate Marvel
In the Ultimate Marvel universe, Pixie's wings and hair share a similar rainbow coloration, and besides her wings, her main power is her teleportation, which is natural to her rather than a mystical spell. She requires recharging to teleport, and each teleportation confers a natural high to her. She helps Kitty Pryde to make a final stand against Jean Grey and her nation of Tian. Pixie is knocked unconscious during the destruction of Tian. The X-Men find her and a group of survivors Pixie managed to save in the ruins of Tian. A mutant named Amp, who can amplify others' powers, gives Pixie a boost and she attempts to teleport everyone back to Utopia, only to accidentally teleport them into a barren dimension filled with the Gah Lak Tus drone swarm. She manages to save an infected Jimmy Hudson by teleporting the individual infected cells out of his body. The X-Men and Rick Jones (Captain Marvel) hold off the swarm until Pixie can recharge, but she is stabbed by a drone before she can teleport the group away.

Avengers vs X-Men
Pixie makes a non-canon appearance in a bonus story of Avengers vs. X-Men: Versus #6. Here she is depicted competing against Squirrel Girl in a game resembling HeroClix where the toys are based on various superheroes. Thing walks in, stopping the game to reveal that the figurines actually belong to the Puppet Master and are made out of his Mind Control Clay. The next day, Squirrel Girl and Pixie read in the Daily Bugle that the clash between the Avengers and X-Men has occurred  and have been mirroring the results from their game, jokingly implying that they were the cause of the feud.

Secret Wars
During the Secret Wars crossover event, Pixie appears as a member of the Runaways, and is a high school student at the Victor Von Doom Institute for Gifted Youths. She is best friends and exes with Jubilee, and is established to be bisexual. She is paired up with the other characters for their Institute's final exam. During the Institute's battle examination, she is killed by a rival team. It was believed by the school's students that the exam was only virtual, and those dead in it were swiftly expelled, but her team discovers her body by accident, and decide to run away from the institute.

In other media

Television
 Pixie appears in Wolverine and the X-Men, voiced by Kate Higgins. In the episode "X-Calibre", she is depicted as having her trademark pink hair and colorful pixie wings. The only ability she displays is flight. In the episode "Greetings from Genosha", Pixie is later seen arriving in Genosha. In the episode "Foresight (Part 2)", she is shown as one mutant caught by a Sentinel.

Video games
 Pixie appears in X-Men: Destiny, voiced by Aileen Ong Casas. She is first seen at a rally attack working with Caliban to locate and rescue fleeing mutants. She is later captured by the Purifiers, leading to a frantic chase across the city to stop them from synthesizing her teleportation powers. The helicopter she's trapped on is shot down and Pixie is killed in the crash.
 Pixie is a playable character in Marvel Super War.

References

External links
 

Comics characters introduced in 2004
Fictional characters with evocation or summoning abilities
Fictional fairies and sprites
Fictional knife-fighters
Fictional Welsh people
Marvel Comics characters who can teleport
Marvel Comics characters who have mental powers
Marvel Comics characters who use magic
Marvel Comics mutants
Marvel Comics female superheroes
Marvel Comics LGBT superheroes
Fictional bisexual females
British superheroes
Characters created by Nunzio DeFilippis
Characters created by Christina Weir